Joseph Frederick Taggart (29 January 1906 – 6 September 1986) was an English professional golfer of the inter-war period. He finished 11th in the 1928 Open Championship.

Early life
Taggart was born in Alderley Edge, Cheshire in 1906. His father, Joe (1881–1944), was the professional at Wilmslow Golf Club.

Golf career
Taggart's best finish in the Open Championship was tied for 11th place in 1928. He was tied for 6th place after 36 holes, with rounds of 76 and 74. Final day rounds of 77 and 67 dropped him to 11th place. In the 1931 Open Championship Taggart started with a 70 to lie in second place behind Henry Cotton. Rounds of 76, 82 and 77 left him tied for 31st place.

Fred succeeded his father as professional at Wilmslow in 1934.

Results in major championships

Note: Taggart only played in The Open Championship.

CUT = missed the half-way cut
"T" indicates a tie for a place

References

English male golfers
People from Alderley Edge
1906 births
1986 deaths